Andrew Norman (born October 31, 1979) is an American composer of contemporary classical music whose texturally complex music is influenced by architecture and the visual arts. His string trio The Companion Guide to Rome (2010), was a runner-up for the 2012 Pulitzer Prize for Music. While composer-in-residence for the Boston Modern Orchestra Project, he first gained international attention for the orchestral work Play (2013), which was nominated for the 2016 Grammy Award for Best Contemporary Classical Composition and won the 2017 Grawemeyer Award for Music Composition. He received another Grammy nomination for the orchestral work Sustain (2018), a commission from the Los Angeles Philharmonic. Other noted works include the fantasy for piano and orchestra Split (2015) and the opera A Trip to the Moon (2017). Since 2020, Norman has been on the composition faculty of the Juilliard School.

Biography
Norman studied composition at the University of Southern California and Yale University. Much of his music is influenced by architecture and visual arts, in which he has had a lifelong interest. He was composer-in-residence for the Boston Modern Orchestra Project from 2011 to 2013. Among his most notable works are the 2010 string trio The Companion Guide to Rome, the 2013 symphony Play, the 2015 fantasy for piano and orchestra Split, the 2017 opera A Trip to the Moon, and the 2018 orchestral work Sustain.

His composition The Companion Guide to Rome (inspired by the guidebook of the same name written by Georgina Masson)  was a runner-up for the 2012 Pulitzer Prize for Music. A recording of Play by the Boston Modern Orchestra Project was named one of the best classical music recordings of 2015 by David Allen of The New York Times and nominated for the 2016 Grammy Award for Best Classical Contemporary Composition.

Norman won the 2017 Grawemeyer Award for Music Composition for Play, which the music writer Will Robin called "the best orchestral work that the 21st century has seen thus far". In reference to the prize, Norman said in an interview with NPR:

In 2018, the Los Angeles Philharmonic commissioned Norman to write Sustain for the beginning of their centennial season. Norman was a finalist for the 2019 Pulitzer Prize for Music for the work. In 2020, it won him a nomination for the Grammy Award for Best Contemporary Classical Composition, and the Los Angeles Philharmonic won the Grammy Award for Best Orchestral Performance for their 2019 recording of the piece. He was a MacDowell Fellow in 2008, 2009, 2011, 2012, and 2014.

Norman is currently on the composition faculty of the Juilliard School, and is serving as Carnegie Hall's Debs Composer's Chair for the 2020–2021 season. He was previously an Assistant Professor of Composition at the USC Thornton School of Music.
Andrew Norman is program director of the Nancy and Barry Sanders Youth Composer program at the Los Angeles Philharmonic,  through which he teaches composition for larger ensembles. His works are published by Schott Music.   

On October 31, 2020, 31 members of the Berlin Philharmoniker performed Norman's composition Sabina (arranged for string orchestra), described as "a sound painting full of iridescent reflections of light", at the Philharmonie in Berlin. The arrangement was commissioned by the Berlin Philharmoniker Foundation.

List of compositions

Opera 
 A Trip to the Moon, a Melodrama for Children (2017)

Chamber
Light Screens (2002) for flute and string trio
Farnsworth: Four Portraits of a House (2004) for four clarinets, flute, violin, piano, and percussion
Gran Turismo (2004) for violin octet
Garden of Follies (2006) for alto saxophone and piano
The Companion Guide to Rome (2010) for string trio
Try (2011) for large chamber ensemble
Peculiar Strokes (2011–2015) for string quartet
Music in Circles (2012) for flute, clarinet, trumpet, violin, viola, and cello
Mime Mime Mime (2015) for flute, clarinet, violin, cello, piano, and percussion
Frank's House (2015) for two pianos and two percussion

Orchestral
Sacred Geometry (2003)
Drip Blip Sparkle Spin Glint Glide Glow Float Flop Chop Pop Shatter Splash (2005)
Unstuck (2008)
The Great Swiftness (2010) for chamber orchestra
Apart (2011)
Play (2013, rev. 2016)
Suspend (2014) for solo piano and orchestra
Split (2015) for solo piano and orchestra
Switch (2015) for solo percussion and orchestra
Spiral (2018)
Sustain (2018)

Solo
Sabina (2008–09) for violin, viola, or cello
For Ashley (2016) for solo cello

Vocal
Lullaby (2007) for mezzo-soprano and piano
Don't Even Listen (2010)

References

External links
Official website

1979 births
21st-century American composers
21st-century American male musicians
21st-century classical composers
21st-century LGBT people
American classical composers
American contemporary classical composers
American male classical composers
LGBT classical composers
American LGBT musicians
Living people
USC Thornton School of Music alumni
Yale School of Music alumni